Now That I Have You is a Filipino film starring John Lloyd Cruz and Bea Alonzo (both remained from It Might Be You). The film premiered on August 11, 2004 at SM Megamall, under Star Cinema and directed by Laurenti M. Dyogi. The film got a "B" rating from the Cinema Evaluation Board of the Philippines.
"Now that I Have You" is also the soundtrack to the film performed by Erik Santos and Sheryn Regis, a song originally sung by The Company.

Plot
Betsy (Bea Alonzo) and Michael (John Lloyd Cruz) are only two of the people who ride the Manila Metro Rail Transit System Line 3 every day. Betsy is a hopeless romantic, while Michael is a non-believer when it comes to love and romance.

Betsy is overcome with excitement when her best friend (Nikki Valdez) and her boyfriend set Betsy up on a date with Michael. However, when they finally meet, Michael turns out to be the exact opposite of her ideal man. But Betsy doesn't let herself become disheartened, instead she allows herself to fall in love with the real Michael.

Cast

Main
 John Lloyd Cruz as Michael Morelos
 Bea Alonzo as Betsy Rallos

Also starring
 John Arcilla as Oscar Morelos
 Rio Locsin as Ceres Rallos
 Jean Saburit as Lucille Morelos
 Noel Colet as Pocholo Rallos
 Nikki Valdez as Stefi [Estefania]
 Kristopher Peralta as Jacob
 Lui Villaruz as Martin
 Jojit Lorenzo as Gabriel
 Hyubs Azarcon as Chito Perez
 Cholo Escaño as Khalil Rallos

Introducing
 Roxanne Guinoo as Katherine
 Neri Naig as Joey

Credits
AdProm and Publicity: Roxy A. Liquigan, El Oro (The Team)
Sound Engineer: Bebet Casas
Musical Director:Jesse Lucas
Film Editor:Marya Ignacio
Production Designer:Elfren Vibar
Story and Screenplay by:Jose Javier Reyes
Director of Photography: Regiben O. Romana
Line Producer: Marizel Samson-Martinez
Executive Producers: Malou N. Santos, Charo Santos-Concio
Directed by: Laurenti Dyogi

External links 
 

2004 films
2004 romantic drama films
2000s Tagalog-language films
Star Cinema films
Philippine romantic drama films